Morgan Creek Vineyards may refer to:
Morgan Creek Vineyards (Alabama)
Morgan Creek Vineyards (Minnesota)